Jason A. Engle is an American artist, whose work has appeared in role-playing games and collectible card games.

Early life 
Jason Engle was born in southern California in 1979.

Career
His Dungeons & Dragons work includes Shining South (2004), Lost Empires of Faerûn (2005), Champions of Ruin (2005), Champions of Valor (2005), Spell Compendium (2005), Rules Compendium (2007), and the 4th edition Dungeon Master's Guide (2008), Monster Manual (2008), Manual of the Planes (2008), Martial Power (2008), Player's Handbook 3 (2010), and Tomb of Horrors (2010).

He is known for his work on the Magic: The Gathering collectible card game.

References

External links
 Jason A. Engle's website
 

1979 births
Artists from California
Living people
Place of birth missing (living people)
Role-playing game artists